Amargeti is a village in the Paphos District of Cyprus, located  north of Axylou. Amargeti is located at 391m above sea level and the annual rainfall is about 600 mm.

References

Notes

Communities in Paphos District